Gujrat Warriors (GW) is a Kabaddi club based in Gujrat, Punjab, Pakistan that plays in the Super Kabaddi League (SKL). The team is currently led by Tehseen Ullah. The team was the inaugural champions of the 2018 Super Kabaddi League.

Franchise history
Super Kabaddi League is a professional Kabaddi league in Pakistan, based on the format of group games and eliminator. The first edition of the tournament was played in 2018 with ten franchises representing various cities in Pakistan.

The team won the inaugural Super Kabaddi League after defeating Faisalabad Sherdils in the final 38-26. Gujrat Warriors' Tehseen Ullah was declared the Man of the Final.

Current squad

See also
 Super Kabaddi League
 Pakistan national kabaddi team
 Pakistan Kabaddi Federation

References

External links
 

Gujrat, Pakistan
Kabaddi in Pakistan
Kabaddi clubs established in 2018
2018 establishments in Pakistan